"Mind Games" is a song written and performed by John Lennon, released as a single in 1973 on Apple Records. It was the lead single for the album of the same name. The UK single and album were issued simultaneously on 16 November 1973. In the US it peaked at No. 18 on the Billboard Hot 100 and No. 10 on the Cashbox Top 100. In the UK it peaked at No. 26.

Background
This song, which was begun in 1969 was originally titled "Make Love, Not War", a popular anti-war slogan at that time. Another song, "I Promise", contains the melody that would later appear on "Mind Games". The original Lennon demos for "Make Love, Not War" and "I Promise", recorded in 1970, are available on the John Lennon Anthology. Lennon finished writing the song after reading the book Mind Games: The Guide to Inner Space by Robert Masters and Jean Houston (1972). Lennon later encountered Masters in a restaurant and told him, "I am one of your fans. You wrote Mind Games."

This eloquent track evoked lingering hippie sentiments mixed with the evolving mysticism of the early 1970s. In keeping with the original theme, the lyrics advocate unity, love, and a positive outlook.  According to Billboard, the song asserts "that positive thoughts are the answer to happiness.  The lyric "YES is the answer" is a nod to his wife Yoko Ono's art piece that brought them together originally. The song was recorded as Lennon split with her for his 18-month "lost weekend" with May Pang. Although it did not involve producer Phil Spector, it nonetheless revealed what Lennon had learned from working with him.

Cash Box said that "top flight vocal performance backed by that steady, yet driving, tempo accentuates some great lyrics, all in making for a great song."

Personnel
John Lennon – vocals, guitar, slide guitar, clavichord
David Spinozza – guitar
Ken Ascher – Mellotron
Gordon Edwards – bass guitar
Jim Keltner – drums
Personnel per The Beatles Bible.

Chart performance

Weekly charts

Year-end charts

Regional popularity
"Mind Games" did best in Chicago, where it reached number six on the weekly survey of radio superstation WLS-AM.  It was ranked as the 81st biggest hit of 1973.

Cover versions
In 1990 South African musician Ratau Mike Makhalemele released an EP of Lennon covers including a 16-minute-long version of Mind Games.

In 1995, it was recorded by George Clinton for the John Lennon tribute album Working Class Hero: A Tribute to John Lennon.

In 1997, it was recorded by DJ Krush with vocals by Eri Ohno for the album MiLight.

In 2001, Kevin Spacey performed the song in New York as part of the tribute concert Come Together: A Night for John Lennon's Words and Music, shortly after 9/11.

The Irish band Hal covered Mind Games for Q Magazine in 2005.

In 2006, it was covered by German rock /pop group MIA., as well as Australian band, Eskimo Joe, as part of the project Make Some Noise to support Amnesty International. Eskimo Joe's cover would also appear on the International release of "Instant Karma: The Amnesty International Campaign to Save Darfur" as well as the Complete Recordings of the same project.

In 2007, Gavin Rossdale's version appeared on Instant Karma: The Amnesty International Campaign to Save Darfur as an iTunes exclusive bonus track.

In April 2009, Sinéad O'Connor's version of the song recorded in the mid 1990s appeared on the re-released deluxe edition of her second album, I Do Not Want What I Haven't Got.

In 2017, Arcade Fire released a cover on Spotify, and performed the song multiple times live in concert.

In 2020, German singer-songwriter Niels Frevert covered Mind Games for the Rolling Stone magazine tribute album Lennon Re-imagined.

References

External links
 

1973 songs
1973 singles
John Lennon songs
Apple Records singles
Songs written by John Lennon
Song recordings produced by John Lennon
Plastic Ono Band songs